Yaghoubi is a surname. Notable people with the surname include:

Alireza Yaghoubi (born 1990), Iranian entrepreneur, engineer, inventor, and designer
Mehdi Yaghoubi (born 1930), Iranian wrestler
Mohammad Hadi Yaghoubi (born 1991), Iranian footballer
Moshtagh Yaghoubi (born 1994), Finnish footballer